Beware the Fetish is the second album by Congolese musical collective Kasai Allstars.

Track listing

Reception
The album was well received by critics: according to Metacritic, the album has received an average review score of 81/100, based on 8 reviews.

References

2014 albums